Hermosa (Spanish for "beautiful" or "gorgeous") may refer to:


Places

Philippines
 Hermosa, Bataan

United States
 Hermosa Beach, California
 Hermosa, Colorado
 Hermosa Creek, a stream in Colorado
 Hermosa Creek Wilderness, a wilderness area in Colorado
 Hermosa, Chicago, Illinois
 Hermosa, New Mexico
 Hermosa, South Dakota

Other uses 
 Hermosa (horse) (born 2016), winner of the 2019 1000 Guineas Stakes
 Hermosa (slave ship), a schooner in the coastwise slave trade
 Hermosa (spider), an Indonesian genus of spiders
 Hermosa station, a former commuter rail station in Chicago